Four Stones for Kanemitsu is a 1973 American short documentary film, written and produced by June Wayne and filmed by Terry Sanders. It was nominated for an Academy Award for Best Documentary Short. The film is educational and records in details each of the steps in making of a color lithograph by artist, Matsumi Kanemitsu.

See also
 List of American films of 1973

References

External links

1973 films
1973 short films
1973 documentary films
American short documentary films
Documentary films about painters
1970s short documentary films
1970s English-language films
1970s American films